Events in the year 1960 in Portugal.

Incumbents
President: Américo Tomás 
Prime Minister: António de Oliveira Salazar

Sport
In association football, for the first-tier league seasons, see 1959–60 Primeira Divisão and 1960–61 Primeira Divisão; for the Taça de Portugal seasons, see 1959–60 Taça de Portugal and 1960–61 Taça de Portugal. 
 3 July - Taça de Portugal Final
 14 August - Portuguese Grand Prix
 25 August - 11 September - Portugal at the 1960 Summer Olympics
 Establishment of the Volta ao Algarve
 Establishment of AD Grijó, C.D. Paços de Brandão and FC Alpendorada

References

 
Portugal
Years of the 20th century in Portugal
Portugal